Ryan Matthew Stonehouse (born May 11, 1999) is an American football punter for the Tennessee Titans of the National Football League (NFL). He played college football at Colorado State and signed with the Titans as an undrafted free agent in 2022.

Stonehouse currently holds the NCAA FBS and Mountain West Conference records for highest career average yards per punt, as well as the NFL single-season record for average yards per punt.

Early life
Stonehouse was born on May 11, 1999, in San Dimas, California to parents Natalie Banks and Paul Stonehouse. His father, Paul, was a punter for Stanford from 1989 to 1992. Two of his uncles were also Division I punters: John Stonehouse (USC, 1992–95) and Jeff Banks (Washington State, 1996–97).

Stonehouse attended Mater Dei High School in Santa Ana, California. In 2016, he helped his Mater Dei team to a 13–1 record and a deep CIF playoff run, losing in the semi-finals to St. John Bosco. Stonehouse was named a Blue & Grey All-American and was named to the 2016 L.A. Times All-Star football team, among other awards. He also participated in the Kohl's Kicking 2016 Western Winter Showcase and was rated as a five-star punter.

Stonehouse was officially rated as a three-star recruit and the third best punter prospect in the class of 2017 by 247Sports.com.

College career
Stonehouse received 11 total offers from NCAA Division I schools. On February 14, 2017, he accepted a scholarship offer from Colorado State over offers from Arizona, Cal, Cornell, Eastern Washington, Illinois, Tennessee, Toledo, Utah State, UTSA, and Wyoming.

As a freshman in 2017, Stonehouse was named to the Ray Guy Award watch list, as well as receiving an All-Mountain West honorable mention. Stonehouse was one of five true freshman to play in every game; he punted 46 times in 13 games and ranked fifth in the country with a 45.9-yard punt average.

As a sophomore in 2018, Stonehouse played in all 12 games and finished second in the FBS with a 48.3-yard punt average. He punted 65 times for a total 3,140 yards, placing 18 punts within the 20-yard line. Stonehouse was selected to the 2018 All-Mountain West first team, as well as being named to the 2018 Sporting News All-American second team.

As a junior in 2019, Stonehouse was named to the All-Mountain West first team for the second consecutive year after punting 49 times for 2,274 yards with a 46.4-yard punt average.

As a senior in 2020, Stonehouse played in all four games, as the season was heavily condensed due to the COVID-19 pandemic. In just four games, he punted 26 times for 1,178 yards and was named to the All-Mountain West first team for the third consecutive year.

As a graduate student in 2021, his final year at CSU, Stonehouse was ranked the best punter and the 34th best overall player in the Mountain West Conference entering the season. Stonehouse finished the season having punted 58 times for 2,953 yards, recording a career best single-season punt average of 50.9 yards. Despite this, Stonehouse was named to the 2021 All-Mountain West second team, as San Diego State punter Matt Araiza, who led the FBS and Mountain West with an 51.5 yard punt average, was named to the first team.

Over the span of his collegiate career, Stonehouse punted 244 times for a total of 11,656 yards. He broke the NCAA FBS record for highest career average yards per punt with his 47.8 yard average, which was previously held by Florida punter Johnny Townsend with a 46.2 average. Stonehouse also holds the Mountain West Conference's highest career average yards per punt record, previously held by BYU punter Matt Payne (45.4; 2001–04).

Professional career

Tennessee Titans

2022 season
Stonehouse signed with the Tennessee Titans as an undrafted free agent on May 13, 2022. He performed well throughout the preseason and won the punting job when the Titans released longtime punter Brett Kern on August 29, 2022. 

During a narrow Week 3 24–22 victory over the Las Vegas Raiders, Stonehouse punted thrice for 181 yards with a long of 70 yards. Two weeks later against the Washington Commanders, he punted eight times for 416 yards in the 21–17 road victory. Stonehouse was named AFC Special Teams Player of the Month for October after punting 20 times for 1,033 yards and a 51.7 average.

During a Week 10 17–10 victory over the Denver Broncos, Stonehouse punted eight times for 432 yards, including three inside the 10-yard line with a long of 74 yards, earning AFC Special Teams Player of the Week. Two weeks later against the Cincinnati Bengals, he had five punts for 269 yards with a long of 71 yards. In the next game against the Philadelphia Eagles, Stonehouse punted seven times for 401 yards as the Titans lost on the road by a score of 35–10.

Stonehouse recorded an average of 53.1 yards per punt throughout his rookie season, which set a new single-season NFL record. The record, previously set in 1940 by Sammy Baugh with a 51.4 average, lasted 82 seasons before being broken by Stonehouse. He was also the punting yards leader for the 2022 season, punting 90 times for a total of 4,779 yards.

NFL career statistics

Regular season

Personal life
Stonehouse enjoys DIY projects. In his spare time, he has built various projects, including a covered outdoor kitchen in his backyard. Stonehouse also enjoys fostering and working with shelter dogs.

References

External links
 Tennessee Titans bio
Colorado State Rams bio

1999 births
Living people
American football punters
Colorado State Rams football players
Players of American football from California
Sportspeople from Los Angeles County, California
People from La Verne, California
Tennessee Titans players